Damir Čakar (Cyrillic: Дамир Чакар; born 28 June 1973) is a Montenegrin former professional footballer who played as either a striker or an attacking midfielder. He is mostly known for his powerful shots and set pieces.

Club career
Čakar started out at his local club Rudar Pljevlja, before joining Budućnost Titograd, aged 15. He made his senior debut for the side in the final 1991–92 edition of the Yugoslav First League. Afterwards, Čakar returned to Rudar Pljevlja for the 1992–93 Second League of FR Yugoslavia, helping them win promotion to the First League of FR Yugoslavia. He subsequently moved to Borac Čačak, spending the following year and a half at the club.

In the 1995 winter transfer window, Čakar was transferred to Partizan. He was the team's top scorer in 1995–96 and 1996–97, helping them win back-to-back championships. In the summer of 1997, Čakar was sold to French side Châteauroux. He scored three league goals in his debut season at the club, as they suffered relegation from the top flight. In the following 1998–99 campaign, Čakar appeared in only five league games, before eventually leaving Châteauroux.

After two years abroad, Čakar returned to FR Yugoslavia and joined ambitious Sartid Smederevo. He however failed to make an impact there due to an injury, before terminating his contract by mutual agreement with the club's chairman. Subsequently, Čakar signed with Sutjeska Nikšić. He scored 19 league goals in 23 appearances in the 2000–01 First League of FR Yugoslavia, securing him a return to his former club Partizan. In the following two seasons, Čakar added two more championship titles to his collection. He also helped Partizan reach the UEFA Champions League group stage in the 2003–04 campaign. In February 2005, Čakar was loaned to his parent club Rudar Pljevlja.

In the summer of 2005, Čakar extended his contract with Rudar Pljevlja, helping the side win the Montenegrin Cup in its first edition. He subsequently moved to fellow Montenegrin First League club Mogren, winning his second national cup, before eventually retiring from the game.

International career
At international level, Čakar earned three caps for FR Yugoslavia. He made his national team debut on 31 March 1995, coming on as a substitute for Dejan Stefanović in a 1–0 friendly win over Uruguay. Six years later, Čakar received a call-up to the squad for the 2001 Kirin Cup. His final international was during that tournament in July 2001 against hosts Japan.

Post-playing career
In October 2015, Čakar was hired as a scout for Partizan under the newly appointed sporting director Ivica Iliev.

Personal life
Born in Pljevlja, Čakar grew up in a footballing family. His father, Rasim, and his uncle, Safet, both played for Rudar Pljevlja. They are considered among the greatest players in the club's history.

Honours

Club
Partizan
 First League of FR Yugoslavia: 1995–96, 1996–97, 2001–02, 2002–03
Rudar Pljevlja
 Montenegrin Cup: 2006–07
Mogren
 Montenegrin Cup: 2007–08

Individual
 Montenegrin First League Top Scorer: 2006–07

References

External links
 
 
 
 

1973 births
Living people
Sportspeople from Pljevlja
Association football forwards
Association football midfielders
Association football utility players
Yugoslav footballers
Serbia and Montenegro footballers
Serbia and Montenegro international footballers
Montenegrin footballers
FK Budućnost Podgorica players
FK Rudar Pljevlja players
FK Borac Čačak players
FK Partizan players
LB Châteauroux players
FK Smederevo players
FK Sutjeska Nikšić players
FK Mogren players
Yugoslav First League players
First League of Serbia and Montenegro players
Ligue 1 players
Ligue 2 players
Second League of Serbia and Montenegro players
Montenegrin First League players
Serbia and Montenegro expatriate footballers
Expatriate footballers in France
Serbia and Montenegro expatriate sportspeople in France
FK Partizan non-playing staff
Bosniaks of Montenegro